Nevogilde is a former civil parish in the municipality of Porto, Portugal. In 2013, the parish merged into the new parish Aldoar, Foz do Douro e Nevogilde. The population in 2011 was 5,018, in an area of 1.84 km².

References

Former parishes of Porto